Falling Down is a 1993 film by Joel Schumacher, starring Michael Douglas.

Falling Down may also refer to:

Albums 
Falling Down (album), by Jehst

Songs 
"Falling Down" (Atreyu song), 2007
"Falling Down" (Duran Duran song), 2007
"Falling Down" (Lil Peep and XXXTentacion song), 2018
"Falling Down" (Oasis song), 2008
"Falling Down" (Selena Gomez & the Scene song), 2009
"Falling Down" (Space Cowboy song), 2009
"Falling Down" (Sub Focus song), 2013
"Falling Down" (Tears for Fears song), 1995
"Falling Down", by 40 Below Summer from their 2000 album Invitation to the Dance
"Falling Down", by Avril Lavigne from the 2002 soundtrack to the film Sweet Home Alabama
"Falling Down", by Ben Jelen from his 2004 album Give It All Away
"Falling Down", by Breaking Point from their 2001 album Coming of Age
"Falling Down", by Chapterhouse from their 1991 album Whirlpool
"Falling Down", by CunninLynguists from their 2003 album SouthernUnderground
"Falling Down", by Dexter Freebish (2000)
"Falling Down", by Edguy from their 1999 album Theater of Salvation
"Falling Down", by The F-Ups (2003)
"Falling Down", by James from their 2001 album Pleased to Meet You
"Falling Down", by Joe Walsh from his 1974 album So What
"Falling Down", by Kittie from their 2009 album In the Black
"Falling Down", by Lisa Dalbello from her 1996 album whore
"Falling Down", by Luna Halo from their 2007 self-titled album
"Falling Down", by Muse from their 1999 album Showbiz
"Falling Down", by MxPx from their 1995 album Teenage Politics
"Falling Down", by Pennywise from their 2003 album From the Ashes
"Falling Down", by Silverstein from their 2007 album Arrivals & Departures
"Falling Down", by Staind from their 2003 album 14 Shades of Grey
"Falling Down", by Stiff Little Fingers from their 1982 album Now Then...
"Falling Down", by Story of the Year from their 2003 album Page Avenue
"Falling Down", by Tom Waits from his 1988 album Big Time
"Man On The Edge" (also known colloquially as "Falling Down", after the 1993 film of the same name that inspired it), by Iron Maiden from their 1995 album The X Factor

See also 
Falling (disambiguation)
Fall (disambiguation)